Uromacer catesbyi, also known commonly as the blunt-headed Hispaniolan vinesnake and Catesby's pointed snake, is a species of snake in the family Colubridae. The species is endemic to the island of Hispaniola.

Etymology
The specific name, catesbyi, is in honor of English naturalist Mark Catesby.

Geographic range
U. catesbyi is native to the Dominican Republic and Haiti.

Habitat

Behavior
U. catesbyi is an arboreal species.<ref name="iucn 2016"/

Diet
U. catesbyi preys upon frogs, lizards, and birds.

Reproduction
U. catesbyi is oviparous.

Subspecies
Including the nominotypical subspecies, eight subspecies are recognized as being valid.
Uromacer catesbyi catesbyi 
Uromacer catesbyi cereolineatus  
Uromacer catesbyi frondicolor 
Uromacer catesbyi hariolatus  
Uromacer catesbyi inchausteguii 
Uromacer catesbyi insulaevaccarum  
Uromacer catesbyi pampineus  
Uromacer catesbyi scandax 

Nota bene: A binomial authority or trinomial authority in parentheses indicates that the species or subspecies was originally described in a genus other than Uromacer.

References

Further reading
Boulenger GA (1894). Catalogue of the Snakes in the British Museum (Natural History). Volume II., Containing the Conclusion of the Colubridæ Aglyphæ. London: Trustees of the British Museum (Natural History). (Taylor and Francis, printers). xi + 382 pp. + Plates I-XX. (Uromacer catesbyi, pp. 115–116). 
Duméril A-M-C, Bibron G, Duméril A[-H-A] (1854). Erpétologie générale ou histoire naturelle complète des reptiles. Tome septième [Volume 7]. Première Partie. Comprenant l'histoire des serpents non venimeux. Paris: Roret. xvi + 780 pp. (Uromacer catesbyi, new combination, pp. 721–722). (in French).
Schlegel H (1837). Essai sur la physionomie des serpens. Partie Générale. xxviii + 251 pp. AND Partie Descriptive. 606 + xvi pp. Amsterdam: M.H. Schonekat. (Dendrophis catesbyi, new species, pp. 226–227 in Partie Descriptive). (in French).
Schwartz A (1970). "A Systematic Review of Uromacer catesbyi Schlegel (Serpentes, Colubridae)". Tulane Studies in Zoology and Botany 16 (4): 131–149. (Uromacer catesbyi cereolineatus, new subspecies, p. 138; U. c. frondicolor, n. subsp., p. 142; U. c. hariolatus, n. subsp., p. 138; U. c. inchausteguii, n. subsp., p. 143; U. c. insulaevaccarum, n. subsp., p. 136; U. c. pampineus, n. subsp., p. 139).
Schwartz A, Henderson RW (1991). Amphibians and Reptiles of the West Indies: Descriptions, Distributions, and Natural History. Gainesville, Florida: University of Florida, Press. 720 pp. . (Uromacer catesbyi, p. 662).
Schwartz A, Thomas R (1975). A Check-list of West Indian Amphibians and Reptiles. Carnegie Museum of Natural History Special Publication No. 1. Pittsburgh, Pennsylvania: Carnegie Museum of Natural History. 216 pp. (Uromacer catesbyi, pp. 200–201).

Reptiles described in 1837
Reptiles of Haiti
Reptiles of the Dominican Republic
Endemic fauna of Hispaniola